Terrace may refer to:

Landforms and construction

 Fluvial terrace, a natural, flat surface that borders and lies above the floodplain of a stream or river
 Terrace, a street suffix
 Terrace, the portion of a lot between the public sidewalk and the street
 Terrace (earthworks), a leveled surface built into the landscape for agriculture or salt production
 Terrace (building), a raised flat platform
 Terrace garden, an element where a raised flat paved or gravelled section overlooks a prospect
 Terrace (geology), a step-like landform that borders a shoreline or river floodplain
 Terraced house, a style of housing where identical individual houses are cojoined into rows
 Terrace, the roof of a building, especially one accessible to the residents for various purposes
 Terrace, a sidewalk cafe
 Terrace (stadium), standing spectator areas, especially in Europe and South America, or the sloping portion of the outfield in a baseball stadium, not necessarily for seating, but for practical or decorative purposes
 Terraced wall, a wall which is divided into sections, as in, is not a single wall; they are terraced.

Places

Settlements
 Terrace, British Columbia, a community in Canada
 Terrace, Utah, a ghost town in the Great Salt Lake Desert, US

Other places

 Mutual Street Arena, a defunct ice rink in Toronto, Canada, later a roller-skating rink called The Terrace
 St Joseph's College, Gregory Terrace, or just Terrace, a private Christian Brothers school in Brisbane, Queensland, Australia
 Terrace F. Club, a Princeton University eating club
 Terraces (Bahá'í), garden terraces at the Shrine of the Bab on Mount Carmel in Haifa, Israel
 The Terrace, Barnes, a street in the London Borough of Richmond upon Thames, UK
 The Terrace (Greensboro, North Carolina), a facility at the Greensboro Coliseum Complex, US
 The Terrace (Somerville College, Oxford), a café and bar at the University of Oxford, UK

Arts, entertainment, and media

 Terrace, a dome from the video game Super Mario Galaxy
 Terrace (board game), an abstract strategy game played on a terraced board
 Terrace melodic motion in music
 The Terrace, a 1963 Argentine film
 The Terrace, 1909, a painting by Milly Childers

Other uses 

 Tone terracing in phonetics

People with the name

Given name

Terrace Marshall Jr. (born 2000), American football player
Terrace Martin (born 1978), American rap musician

Surname

Herbert S. Terrace (born 1936), American psychologist
Michael Terrace (born 1926), American dancer

See also
 East Terrace, a street in Adelaide, Australia
 North Terrace a street in Adelaide, Australia
 South Terrace (disambiguation)
 West Terrace, Adelaide, a street in Australia
 West Terrace, Barbados, a populated place